The Moses Taft House is an historic house at 50 South Main Street in Uxbridge, Massachusetts.  It is a two-story wood-frame structure, five bays wide, with a side gable roof, central chimney, clapboard siding, and granite foundation.  Built c. 1850–55, it is a fine local example of Italianate architecture, with paneled pilasters at the corners, paired brackets under the eave, and molded caps above the windows.  Additions extend the original house to the side and rear.

The house was built for Moses Taft, an early industrialist in the historic Blackstone Valley.

On October 7, 1983, the house was added to the National Register of Historic Places, where it is listed at 66 South Main Street.

See also
Taft family
National Register of Historic Places listings in Uxbridge, Massachusetts

References

Houses in Uxbridge, Massachusetts
National Register of Historic Places in Uxbridge, Massachusetts
Houses on the National Register of Historic Places in Worcester County, Massachusetts
1850 establishments in Massachusetts